Inconstancy may refer to:
 Inconsistency
 Impermanence

See also 
 Consistency (disambiguation)
 Constancy
 Inconstant